Williams Lake is a lake in the city of the same name in the Cariboo region of the Central Interior of British Columbia, Canada.   Williams Lake Indian Reserve No. 1, a.k.a. "Sugarcane Reserve" is located around the east end of the lake.  British Columbia provincial highway 97, the Cariboo Highway, runs along the lake's northern side.

It is fed by the northwest-flowing San Jose River and drained to the Fraser River via the Williams Lake River.

Climate and Hydrography
Williams Lake has relatively lower water temperatures, because of its lower elevation compared to other lakes on the Cariboo Plateau.

See also
List of lakes in British Columbia

References

Lakes of the Cariboo
Cariboo Land District